The Armstrong Whitworth A.W.23 was a prototype bomber/transport aircraft produced to specification C.26/31 for the British Air Ministry by Armstrong Whitworth Aircraft. While it was not selected to meet this specification, it did form the basis of the later Armstrong Whitworth Whitley aircraft.

Design and development
Specification C.26/31 required a dual-purpose bomber/transport aircraft for service with the Royal Air Force (RAF), with the specification stressing the transport part of its role. The A.W.23 was designed by John Lloyd, chief designer of Armstrong Whitworth to meet this specification, competing with the Handley Page H.P.51 and the Bristol Bombay.

The A.W.23 was a low-wing twin-engine monoplane, powered by two Armstrong Siddeley Tiger engines. It had a fabric covered braced steel fuselage accommodating a large cabin to fulfil its primary transport role but with room for internal bomb racks under the cabin floor. The wings used a novel structure, patented by Armstrong Whitworth, of a massive light alloy box-spar braced internally with steel tubes.  This structure was extremely strong but required a thick wing section, increasing drag. This wing structure was re-used in the Armstrong Whitworth Whitley bomber. The A.W.23 was the first Armstrong Whitworth Aircraft to be fitted with a retractable undercarriage.

A prototype, K3585, was built first flying on 4 June 1935. Owing to its unreliable Tiger engines, its delivery to the RAF for testing was delayed, with the Bombay being declared the winner of the specification. The prototype was given the civil registration G-AFRX in May 1939 being used for inflight refuelling development by Flight Refuelling Ltd who used it with the Short Empire flying boat. It was used in February 1940 for the world's first night refuelling experiments. It was destroyed in a German bombing raid on Ford airfield in June 1940.

Operators

 Flight Refuelling Ltd
 Royal Air Force

Specifications (A.W.23)

See also

References

Bibliography
 
 
 
 

Air refueling
A.W.23
1930s British bomber aircraft
Low-wing aircraft
Aircraft first flown in 1935
Twin piston-engined tractor aircraft